Kings of Crunk is the fourth studio album by Lil Jon & the East Side Boyz.

Background
Kings of Crunk was released in October 2002.

Based on the success of the album's 2nd single "Get Low", Kings of Crunk made the top twenty of the US album chart in September 2003. In the same year, Lil Jon put out a compilation CD and DVD called Part II, which included remixes of "Get Low" featuring Busta Rhymes, Elephant Man, and the Ying Yang Twins.

The singles "I Don't Give a Fuck" and "Nothin's Free" were released To Radio in 2002, while "Play No Games" was released in late 2001 "Get Low" were released to radio in 2003. Also, "Nothin's Free" was released on vinyl, while "I Don't Give a Fuck" and "Get Low" were released on CD.
"Play No Games" was also released on vinyl and CD In 2003.

This album features rapper Pitbull's first recorded mainstream feature.

Commercial performance 
Kings of Crunk debuted at number 15 on the US Billboard 200 chart, selling 71,000 in its first week and as of November 2004, the album has sold 2.2 million copies in the United States.

Kings of Crunk was the highest selling independent album for both 2003 and 2004.

Track listing

Original release

Special edition

 For the track "Throw It Up", Lil Jon worked with the leitmotif ("Lux Aeterna") of the movie "Requiem For A Dream" which was composed by Clint Mansell.

Charts

Weekly charts

Year-end charts

References

2002 albums
Lil Jon & the East Side Boyz albums
Albums produced by Lil Jon